Vestkysten was a Norwegian newspaper that was established on 16 September 1987. It was founded in Stavanger with capital from private enterprise and interested businesspeople. Editor-in-chief was Arvid Weber Skjærpe. The newspaper was disestablished in the same year, on 24 November.

References

1987 establishments in Norway
1987 disestablishments in Norway
Defunct newspapers published in Norway
Mass media in Stavanger
Norwegian-language newspapers
Publications disestablished in 1987
Publications established in 1987